The Sandnes Oilers were an American football team based in Sandnes, Norway. They were members of the Norway American Football Federation (NoAFF). The team was founded in 1991 and was based in Stavanger before moving to Sandnes in 1992. The team played its first season in 1993, winning all its games in the NoAFF Division II.  The team played its home games at Giskebanen Field in Sandnes.  The Oilers competed in NoAFF Division I between 1994 and 1998 followed by three seasons in Division II before returning to Division I play in 2002 and continuing until 2007.

In addition to fielding a team at the senior level (ages 18 and above), the Oilers fielded an U-19 team from 1995 until 2002, winning the Norwegian Championship in 1998 with an 8-0 record (136 points for, 0 points against).

Currently, the only American Football team in Stavanger/Sandnes area is the Lura Bulls.

Notable players
Håkon Strande Henriksen
Raymond Rød

External links
NoAFF Official Website
Lura Bulls Official Website

American football teams in Norway
1991 establishments in Norway
American football teams established in 1991